Tommy Paul Wood (born 26 November 1998) is an English footballer who plays as a forward for Hampton & Richmond Borough.

Career
After spells in the academy teams at Wycombe Wanderers and Reading, Wood signed a two-year scholarship with Burnley in 2015. After winning the player of the season award for the Clarets youth team in 2016–17, his scholarship was extended for another year, and he experienced senior football for the first time with loan spells at Barnoldswick Town and Ossett Albion. He was released at the end of the season.

Wood joined AFC Wimbledon in May 2018. He made his league debut as an 84th-minute substitute in the 0–3 loss to Fleetwood Town on 22 January 2019.

In February 2019, he joined Slough Town on a one-month loan deal.

On 14 March 2019, he joined Burgess Hill Town on loan until the end of the season. Two days later, he scored the winning goal on his debut, a 3–2 away win against Kingstonian.

On 6 September 2019, he joined Leatherhead on an initial 28 day loan deal. After returning to Wimbledon from his loan period he scored his first goal for the club in an EFL Trophy tie against Southend United on 13 November 2019. In June 2020, Wood was among the group of players whose contracts were not renewed by AFC Wimbledon.

Wood joined Tonbridge on a permanent deal on 13 October 2020.

On 25 May 2022, after two campaigns at Tonbridge, Wood agreed to join Hampton & Richmond Borough ahead of the 2022–23 season.

Career statistics

References

External links
AFC Wimbledon profile

1998 births
Living people
English footballers
Association football forwards
Wycombe Wanderers F.C. players
Reading F.C. players
AFC Wimbledon players
Burnley F.C. players
Barnoldswick Town F.C. players
Ossett Albion A.F.C. players
Slough Town F.C. players
Burgess Hill Town F.C. players
Leatherhead F.C. players
Tonbridge Angels F.C. players
Hampton & Richmond Borough F.C. players
English Football League players
National League (English football) players
Northern Premier League players
Isthmian League players
Footballers from the London Borough of Hillingdon